Roxatidine acetate is a specific and competitive histamine H2 receptor antagonist drug that is used to treat gastric ulcers, Zollinger–Ellison syndrome,  erosive esophagitis,  gastro-oesophageal reflux disease, and gastritis.

Pharmacodynamic studies showed that 150 mg of roxatidine acetate were optimal in suppressing gastric acid secretion, and that a single bedtime dose of 150 mg was more effective than a dose of 75 mg twice daily in terms of inhibiting nocturnal acid secretion.

It was patented in 1979 and approved for medical use in 1986. It is available in countries including China, Japan, Korea, Germany, Italy, the Netherlands, Greece and South Africa.

References 

H2 receptor antagonists
1-Piperidinyl compounds
Phenol ethers
Acetamides
Acetate esters